The Alfalfa Club is a social club that exists only to hold an annual black tie banquet on the last Saturday of January at the Capital Hilton in Washington D.C., with an after-party at a local restaurant. The banquet, which lasts 4 hours, features music by the United States Marine Band as well as a political roast. There are approximately 200 members of the club, all of them influential politicians and business executives. The club has an invitation system; members are required to be invited to join. Invitations are extended to prospective members annually to fill the spots of recently deceased members. Several Presidents of the United States have been members of the club. The press is not allowed to attend the banquet.

The club was named in reference to the alfalfa plant's supposed willingness to "do anything for a drink."

If in attendance, the President of the United States is usually asked to deliver remarks at the banquet. President George W. Bush spoke at the banquet each year of his presidency; the Alfalfa Club was one of only three clubs that his father, George H. W. Bush, was a member of as president. President Obama attended and spoke at the banquet in 2009 and in 2012.

Annual club president nomination
One of the evening's activities includes the playful nomination of a presidential candidate by the Club's leadership. The candidate is then required to make a speech. Several such candidates became President of the United States after being nominated, including Richard Nixon in 1965 (elected in 1968), Ronald Reagan in 1974 (elected in 1980), and George W. Bush in 1998 (elected in 2000). In 1969, it nominated Harold Stassen. In 2004, the Club nominated Jack Valenti, the former president of the Motion Picture Association of America. Its 2000 nomination was Australian-born James Wolfensohn, constitutionally ineligible for election to the U.S. presidency. In 2001, the presidential nomination went to John McCain. In 2011, Sandra Day O’Connor became the first female president of the club. In 2017, Michael Bloomberg was elected president of the club. In 2018, John Kerry was elected president. In 2019, Mitt Romney was elected. In 2020, David Rubenstein was elected.

History
The club was formed by four southerners in the Willard Hotel to celebrate the birthday of Confederate Civil War General Robert E. Lee. It began admitting Black people in 1974 and women in 1994. In 2009, President Barack Obama spoke at the club's annual dinner, saying, "This dinner began almost one hundred years ago as a way to celebrate the birthday of General Robert E. Lee. If he were here with us tonight, the General would be 202 years old. And very confused."

In addition to its January banquet in Washington, the club previously held an annual summer picnic.

In 1986, William H. Rehnquist's membership in the club became the subject of discussion in a Senate Judiciary hearing after Rehnquist was nominated to be Chief Justice of the United States. He described the club as one that "met once a year to listen to patriotic music and 'hear some funny political speeches and said "he did not think his membership in such a once-a-year group violated the canons of judicial ethics."

In 1994, after a boycott by President Bill Clinton over a lack of women in the club, the club admitted its first women members, Sandra Day O'Connor, Elizabeth Dole, and Katharine Graham, whose father, Eugene Meyer, had also been a member. Clinton's boycott had been the first by a U.S. president since Jimmy Carter.

During the 2012 dinner, Occupy D.C. protested the banquet.

See also
List of Alfalfa Club members

References

Clubs and societies in Washington, D.C.
Culture of Washington, D.C.
Organizations established in 1913
1913 establishments in Washington, D.C.
Robert E. Lee